Nina Bulatović (born 9 December 1996) is a Montenegrin handballer for ŽRK Budućnost Podgorica and the Montenegrin national team.

She represented Montenegro at the 2022 European Women's Handball Championship.

References

External links

1996 births
Living people
Montenegrin female handball players
Sportspeople from Cetinje